This article features the 2002 UEFA European Under-19 Championship qualifying stage. Matches were played 2001 through 2002. Two qualifying rounds were organised and seven teams qualified for the main tournament, joining host Norway.

Round 1

Group 1

{| cellspacing=1 width=70%
!width=25%| !!width=30%| !!width=15%| !!width=30%|
|-
|
|align=right|
|align=center|3–2
|
|-
|
|align=right|
|align=center|0–4
|
|-
|
|align=right|
|align=center|2–1
|
|-
|
|align=right|
|align=center|2–2
|
|-
|
|align=right|
|align=center|3–1
|
|-
|
|align=right|
|align=center|2–1
|

Group 2

All matches were played in Estonia.
{| cellspacing=1 width=70%
!width=25%| !!width=30%| !!width=15%| !!width=30%|
|-
|
|align=right|
|align=center|1–6
|
|-
|
|align=right|
|align=center|0–1
|
|-
|
|align=right|
|align=center|3–0
|

Group 3

All matches were played in Lithuania.
{| cellspacing=1 width=70%
!width=25%| !!width=30%| !!width=15%| !!width=30%|
|-
|
|align=right|
|align=center|1–0
|
|-
|
|align=right|
|align=center|0–2
|
|-
|
|align=right|
|align=center|3–1
|

Group 4

All matches were played in England.
{| cellspacing=1 width=70%
!width=25%| !!width=30%| !!width=15%| !!width=30%|
|-
|
|align=right|
|align=center|4–1
|
|-
|
|align=right|
|align=center|1–1
|
|-
|
|align=right|
|align=center|3–1
|

Group 5

All matches were played in Finland.
{| cellspacing=1 width=70%
!width=25%| !!width=30%| !!width=15%| !!width=30%|
|-
|
|align=right|
|align=center|0–2
|
|-
|
|align=right|
|align=center|2–1
|
|-
|
|align=right|
|align=center|2–3
|

Group 6

{| cellspacing=1 width=70%
!width=25%| !!width=30%| !!width=15%| !!width=30%|
|-
|
|align=right|
|align=center|2–0
|
|-
|
|align=right|
|align=center|0–4
|
|-
|
|align=right|
|align=center|3–1
|
|-
|
|align=right|
|align=center|0–6
|
|-
|
|align=right|
|align=center|6–0
|
|-
|
|align=right|
|align=center|1–3
|

Group 7

All matches were played in the Czech Republic.
{| cellspacing=1 width=70%
!width=25%| !!width=30%| !!width=15%| !!width=30%|
|-
|
|align=right|
|align=center|2–2
|
|-
|
|align=right|
|align=center|3–0
|
|-
|
|align=right|
|align=center|0–7
|
|-
|
|align=right|
|align=center|1–3
|
|-
|
|align=right|
|align=center|1–0
|
|-
|
|align=right|
|align=center|0–13
|

Group 8

All matches were played in Luxembourg.
{| cellspacing=1 width=70%
!width=25%| !!width=30%| !!width=15%| !!width=30%|
|-
|
|align=right|
|align=center|1–4
|
|-
|
|align=right|
|align=center|1–1
|
|-
|
|align=right|
|align=center|1–2
|
|-
|
|align=right|
|align=center|0–1
|
|-
|
|align=right|
|align=center|1–1
|
|-
|
|align=right|
|align=center|1–0
|

Group 9

All matches were played in Liechtenstein.
{| cellspacing=1 width=70%
!width=25%| !!width=30%| !!width=15%| !!width=30%|
|-
|
|align=right|
|align=center|3–0
|
|-
|
|align=right|
|align=center|0–1
|
|-
|
|align=right|
|align=center|1–1
|
|-
|
|align=right|
|align=center|1–1
|
|-
|
|align=right|
|align=center|0–1
|
|-
|
|align=right|
|align=center|0–1
|

Group 10

All matches were played in Italy.
{| cellspacing=1 width=70%
!width=25%| !!width=30%| !!width=15%| !!width=30%|
|-
|
|align=right|
|align=center|0–2
|
|-
|
|align=right|
|align=center|0–2
|
|-
|
|align=right|
|align=center|2–0
|
|-
|
|align=right|
|align=center|0–0
|
|-
|
|align=right|
|align=center|1–2
|
|-
|
|align=right|
|align=center|4–0
|

Group 11

{| cellspacing=1 width=70%
!width=25%| !!width=30%| !!width=15%| !!width=30%|
|-
|
|align=right|
|align=center|1–1
|
|-
|
|align=right|
|align=center|1–1
|
|-
|
|align=right|
|align=center|0–4
|
|-
|
|align=right|
|align=center|3–1
|
|-
|
|align=right|
|align=center|1–1
|
|-
|
|align=right|
|align=center|3–1
|
|-
|
|align=right|
|align=center|1–0
|
|-
|
|align=right|
|align=center|1–0
|
|-
|
|align=right|
|align=center|2–0
|
|-
|
|align=right|
|align=center|3–1
|
|-
|
|align=right|
|align=center|3–0
|
|-
|
|align=right|
|align=center|0–0
|

Group 12

All matches were played in Slovenia.
{| cellspacing=1 width=70%
!width=25%| !!width=30%| !!width=15%| !!width=30%|
|-
|
|align=right|
|align=center|3–2
|
|-
|
|align=right|
|align=center|1–2
|
|-
|
|align=right|
|align=center|2–1
|
|-
|
|align=right|
|align=center|3–0
|
|-
|
|align=right|
|align=center|5–0
|
|-
|
|align=right|
|align=center|2–1
|

Group 13

All matches were played in France.
{| cellspacing=1 width=70%
!width=25%| !!width=30%| !!width=15%| !!width=30%|
|-
|
|align=right|
|align=center|1–8
|
|-
|
|align=right|
|align=center|5–0
|
|-
|
|align=right|
|align=center|7–0
|
|-
|
|align=right|
|align=center|0–5
|
|-
|
|align=right|
|align=center|1–1
|
|-
|
|align=right|
|align=center|2–1
|

Group 14

All matches were played in Ireland.

External links
Results by RSSSF

Qua
UEFA European Under-19 Championship qualification